Viengsavanh Sayyaboun (born 3 June 1989) is a Laotian footballer who plays for Lao Army. He played for Laos national football team at the 2012 AFF Suzuki Cup.

References

External links

1989 births
Living people
Laotian footballers
Laos international footballers
Lao Army F.C. players
Place of birth missing (living people)
Association football midfielders